Groovin' High is an album by American jazz saxophonist Booker Ervin featuring performances recorded in 1963 and 1964 for the Prestige label.

Overview
"Stella by Starlight" was recorded on December 3, 1963, during the same session as The Freedom Book, which also includes this track.  "Groovin' High" was recorded on June 30, 1964, during the same session as The Blues Book, which does not include this track.  "The Second #2" and "Bass-IX" were recorded on October 2, 1964, along with tracks that appeared on The Space Book.  "The Second #2" is an alternate take of "Number Two" from The Space Book, while "Bass-IX" does not appear on that album.

Reception
The Allmusic review by Scott Yanow awarded the album 4½ stars and stated: "Although these performances are not quite classic, Booker Ervin fans will want this CD to round out their collections, for Ervin was at the peak of his powers during this era".

Track listing
 "The Second #2" (Ervin) - 6:36
 "Groovin' High" (Dizzy Gillespie) - 9:53
 "Bass-IX" (Ervin) - 11:45
 "Stella by Starlight" (Ned Washington, Victor Young) - 2:50

Personnel
Booker Ervin - tenor saxophone
Carmell Jones - trumpet (2)
Jaki Byard (1, 3-4), Gildo Mahones (2),  - piano
Richard Davis - bass
Alan Dawson - drums

References

Prestige Records albums
Booker Ervin albums
1966 albums
Albums recorded at Van Gelder Studio
Albums produced by Don Schlitten